KING-LP (95.1 FM), is an American low-power FM radio station broadcasting a religious format. Licensed to Lusk, Wyoming, the station is currently owned by New Life in Christ Baptist Church.

References

External links
 

ING-LP
Niobrara County, Wyoming
Radio stations established in 2015
2015 establishments in Wyoming
ING-LP
Baptist organizations in the United States